Vladyslav Mykhailovych Heraskevych (born 12 January 1999) is a Ukrainian skeleton racer who has competed since 2014. He is the first-ever Ukrainian skeleton racer.

Career
His father, Mykhailo Heraskevych, trains Heraskevych. He began competing in 2014. Previously, he tried boxing.

In February 2016, he participated at 2016 Winter Youth Olympics in Lillehammer, Norway, where he finished 8th. A month earlier, he was 17th at the Junior World Championships in Winterberg, Germany. The following year, he achieved 10th place at the Junior Worlds in Sigulda, Latvia.

On 24 February 2017, he became the first-ever Ukrainian athlete to compete in skeleton at World Championships. He finished 24th at 2017 World Championships in Königssee, Germany.

On 10 November 2017, he debuted in Skeleton World Cup and was 27th in Lake Placid, United States. That season he participated in 7 of 8 races and ranked 24th in World Cup classification.

On 15 January 2018, it was announced that Ukraine received one quota spot for the men's skeleton competition which was the first ever for Ukraine in this sport. At the Olympics, he finished 12th (in the final fourth run he was even 7th) in what was regarded in Ukraine as an enormous success. After such a success, Ukrainian Public TV company UA:First started to broadcast Skeleton World Cup for the first time in the history of Ukrainian television.

In the next World Cup season, Heraskevych started very well by finishing 9th in Sigulda, Latvia. But, he wasn't successful at the European Championships, where he failed to qualify for the second run. At the 2019 World Championships, he finished 14th.

Before the Olympic 2021–22 season, Heraskevych showed relatively stable results, reaching twice Top-10 and qualifying for all second runs in the races he took part in. On 31 December 2022, Heraskevych achieved his new World Cup best finish by ranking 6th in Latvian Sigulda.

In 2022, Heraskevych was nominated for his second Winter Games in Beijing. At the Games, he displayed a sign stating "No War in Ukraine" (in reference to the 2021–2022 Russo-Ukrainian crisis), a possible violation of Rule 50 of the Olympic Charter that bans all political displays and demonstrations. The International Olympic Committee (IOC) stated that Heraskevych would not face repercussions for the sign, calling it a "general call for peace".

Four days after the end of the Olympic Games, the 2022 Russian invasion of Ukraine started.  Heraskevych helped deliver food and supplies to the Ukrainian people.

Personal life
Heraskevych graduated from the faculty of physics at the Taras Shevchenko National University of Kyiv.

Career results

Winter Olympics

World Championships

European Championships

Skeleton World Cup

Rankings

Results

References

External links

 
 
 

1999 births
Living people
Sportspeople from Kyiv
Ukrainian male skeleton racers
Skeleton racers at the 2018 Winter Olympics
Skeleton racers at the 2022 Winter Olympics
Olympic skeleton racers of Ukraine
Skeleton racers at the 2016 Winter Youth Olympics
Taras Shevchenko National University of Kyiv alumni
People of the 2022 Russian invasion of Ukraine